The Exchange is a 1952 West German comedy film directed by Karl Anton and starring Viktor Staal, Carola Höhn, and Gertrud Kückelmann. It was made at the Bavaria Studios in Munich. The film's sets were designed by the art director Hans Sohnle.

Plot
While drunk a farmer agrees to exchange his wife for a prize breeding bull for several days.

Cast

References

External links

1952 comedy films
German comedy films
West German films
Films directed by Karl Anton
Films shot at Bavaria Studios
German black-and-white films
1950s German films